The following is a list of maritime and land borders of the UK and its overseas territories:

See also
 Republic of Ireland–United Kingdom border
 Gibraltar–Spain border
 Borders of Akrotiri and Dhekelia

 
United Kingdom geography-related lists